St. Mary's Bridge may refer to:
McPhee Bridge over the St. Mary's River in Cranbrook, British Columbia
Hi Carpenter Memorial Bridge over the Ohio River connecting Newport, Ohio and St. Marys, West Virginia